Galeazzo Campi  (1475/1477 – 1536) was an Italian painter of the Renaissance from Cremona in Lombardy. He was a pupil of Boccaccio Boccaccini. His representation was rather rigid, but careful. His landscapes show influences of Perugino and Giovanni Bellini.

Biography
Campi was the head of a family of artists, active in the mid and late 16th century in Cremona. Galeazzo is known to have contributed to painting in the church of Sant'Abbondio and for the Duomo of Cremona along with his brother Sebastiano. But the family of artists also included his three sons, Giulio, Antonio and Vincenzo, each who also became a notable painter in their own.

The painters Tommaso Aleni (known also as il Fadino) was said to be a pupil. Among his contemporaries in Cremona were Antonio Cigognini, Francesco Casella, Galeazzo Pesenti (Il Sabbioneta), Lattanzio da Cremona, Nicolo da Cremona, Giovanni Battista Zupelli, and Giovanni Francesco Bembo. Among his pupils was Lorenzo Becci.

Campi's works include a self-portrait, which was given a place in the Uffizi gallery of Florence. Other notable paintings include "Raising of Lazarus" and "A Virgin and Child".

References

Galeazzo Campi on German Wikipedia
Galeazzo Campi, painted by his son Giulio

1470s births
1536 deaths
Painters from Cremona
15th-century Italian painters
Italian male painters
16th-century Italian painters